Žabnica is a settlement in the Municipality of Brezovica in central Slovenia. It lies on the edge of the marshlands south of the capital Ljubljana. The municipality is part of the traditional region of Inner Carniola. It is included in the Central Slovenia Statistical Region.

Name
The name Žabnica is derived from the Slovene common noun žaba 'frog'. It primarily denotes a pond with frogs and, secondarily, a settlement next to such a pond.

History
Žabnica was formerly a hamlet of Plešivica. It became an independent settlement in 1987.

References

External links

Žabnica on Geopedia

Populated places in the Municipality of Brezovica